Österbottens Tidning (abbreviated ÖT) is a Swedish language regional daily newspaper, which is mainly distributed in the largely Swedish speaking Ostrobothnia in Finland.

History and profile
It was formed on 23 May 2008 through a merger of Jakobstads Tidning in Jakobstad (Pietarsaari in Finnish) and Österbottningen in Karleby (Kokkola in Finnish). It is published by HSS Media. The newspaper focuses on the Jakobstad and Kokkola region and it is published daily. 
  
The newspaper had two editors in 2008, Tom Johansson in Karleby and Henrik Othman in Jakobstad. Margareta Björklund is the chief editor.

In May 2013, the online news content was locked behind a hard paywall. The circulation of the paper was 13,817 copies in 2013.

References

External links 
 Österbottens Tidning - Newspaper web site

2008 establishments in Finland
Newspapers established in 2008
Daily newspapers published in Finland
Swedish-language newspapers published in Finland
Mass media in Jakobstad
Mass media in Kokkola